Totto-chan, the Little Girl at the Window is an autobiographical memoir written by Japanese television personality and UNICEF Goodwill Ambassador Tetsuko Kuroyanagi. The book is about the values of the unconventional education that Kuroyanagi received at Tomoe Gakuen, a Tokyo elementary school founded by educator Sosaku Kobayashi during World War II.

The Japanese name of the book is an expression used to describe people who have failed.

Background
After hearing about how children were refusing to attend school, Tetsuko decided to write about her experience attending Tomoe Gakuen. Totto-chan was originally published in Japan as a series of articles in Kodansha's Young Woman magazine appearing from February 1979 through December 1980. The articles were then collected into a book, which made Japanese publishing history by selling more than 5 million before the end of 1982, which made the book break all previous publishing records and become the bestselling book in Japanese history.

An English edition, translated by Dorothy Britton, was published in America in 1984. The book has been translated into a number of languages, including, Arabic, Burmese, Chinese, Dutch, French, Italian, German, Korean, Malay, Nepali, Tagalog, Vietnamese, Indonesian, Thai, Russian, Uyghur, Sinhala, and Lao, and 11 Indian languages including Hindi, Marathi, Gujarati, Telugu, Assamese, Kannada, Tamil, Malayalam, Bengali, and Oriya.

A bilingual collection of stories from the book, entitled Best of Totto-chan: Totto Chan: The Little Girl at the Window, was published in 1996.

Plot synopsis
The book begins with Totto-chan's mother coming to know of her daughter's expulsion from public school. Her mother realizes that Totto-chan needs a school where more freedom of expression is permitted. Thus, she takes Totto-chan to meet the headmaster of the new school, Mr. Kobayashi, where the two establish a friendly teacher-student relationship.

The book describes the friends Totto-chan makes, the lessons she learns, and the vibrant atmosphere she enjoys at Tomoe Gakuen. Mr. Kobayashi introduces new activities to interest the pupils. Mr. Kobayashi understands children and strives to develop their minds and bodies. He is concerned for the physically disabled and emphasizes how all children are remarkable. "Totto-chan" becomes best friends with a Christian boy who has polio. Another classmate was raised in America for all his life and cannot speak Japanese, and the headmaster tells the children to learn English from him, despite governmental restraints against using the "enemy's" language. The epilogue explains how Headmaster Kobayashi had good connections with leaders in government.

But in this the school, the children lead happy lives, unaware of the things going on in the world. World War II has started, yet in this school, no signs of it are seen. There are hints of something awry when "Totto-chan" cannot buy caramel candies from the vending machine on her way to school, and it becomes harder for her mother to meet the requirements for a balanced lunch. In another scene, there is a boy who is bawling his eyes out at being removed from the school by his parents, with Headmaster Kobayashi helplessly letting the student vent with tears forming in his own eyes.

One day, the school is bombed, and is never rebuilt, even though the headmaster claims that he looked forward to building an even better school the next time round. This ends Totto-chan's years as a pupil at Tomoe Gakuen.

Use in classrooms
Starting in 1983, it was used as a textbook for third-year Japanese elementary students, and at least one American school used material from it in 1993.

However, in Aichi Prefecture the book was banned from school libraries for some time because it was written by a television personality, which was seen as a demeaning occupation. Other books banned from Aichi schools in 1981 include books about liberalism and feminism, and Saburō Ienaga's history textbooks which provided details on Japanese war crimes.

Related works
Kuroyanagi founded the Totto-chan Foundation, which professionally trains deaf actors to bring live theater to the deaf community.

In 1999, Kuroyanagi published her book Totto-Chan's Children: A Goodwill Journey to the Children of the World, about her travels around the world on her humanitarian mission as a UNICEF Goodwill Ambassador.

An orchestral interpretation of the work was written by Japanese composer Akihiro Komori, which was released as a record.

An anime film adaptation was announced on March 20, 2023. It will be produced by Shin-Ei Animation and directed by Shinnosuke Yakuwa, with Yakuwa and Yosuke Suzuki writing the scripts, and Shizue Kaneko designing the characters. It it scheduled to be released in Q4 2023.

Translations
 ತೊತ್ತೋ‌ ಚಾನ್― Kannada translation by V Gayathri.
 හරි පුදුම ඉස්කෝලේ (The Wonderful School) - Sinhala n translation by Leelananda Gamachchi.
তোত্তো-চান― Bengali translation by Moushumi Bhowmik.
 তোত্তোচান: জানালার ধারে ছোট্ট মেয়েটি Bengali translation by Chaiti Rahman 

तोत्तो-चान,झ्यालमा रमाउने त्यो सानी केटी. Nepali i translation by Dr. Saroj Dhital.
 'ஜன்னலில் ஒரு சிறுமி' - Tamil Language translation by A Vallinayagam, C. Prabhakaran 
 'ടോട്ടോ-ചാൻ - ജനാലയ്ക്കരികിലെ വികൃതിക്കുട്ടി Malayalam Language translation by Anwar Ali first published by Kerala Shastra Sahitya Parishad and later by NBS
 ত’ত্ত’চ্চান - Assamese translation by Toshprabha Kalita.
 توت تو چان - کھڑکی پر کھڑی چھوٹی سی لڑکی - Urdu translation by Tahera Hasan published by National book trust India, first Urdu edition in 1999 and second in 2008.

References

Book References

1981 Japanese novels
Japanese autobiographical novels
Japanese children's novels
Novels set in Tokyo
1981 children's books
Novels set in elementary and primary schools